Cartoons is the second single by American hip hop artist Cupcakke from her third studio album Ephorize. The song was released November 10, 2017 via TuneCore. It received recognition from Cardi B, with the rapper posting a line from the song on her Twitter.

Background
CupcakKe announced a single would be coming on November 10, 2017 via her Twitter page. "Cartoons" was then released as a digital download.

Composition
"Cartoons" "incorporates the wall of sound adlibs of her former high school peer Chief Keef as she barrels through broadside punchlines...while a dissonant steel drum pattern swirls behind her." Vulture stated that "Cartoons" is made up of " breakneck, demented kids'-TV references." Pitchfork reviewed the song stating that "on 'Cartoons' ... CupcakKe returns to her bar-heavy drill mentality, using imagery from 'The Flintstones' and 'Scooby-Doo' to add color to her boasts. She delivers aggressive raps through wind-chime synths that twinkle around her, as thumping drum patterns alternate. When the beat opens up, leaving nothing but a banging steel drum, she fills up the remaining space with her commanding voice.

Promotion
"Cartoons" received a music video on November 18, 2017. According to Mass Appeal, "there are no visible cartoon characters from her lyrics in the video, but there is a red Bentley to show you how CupcakKe is living, and an attack via baseball bat to show you what happens when you waste her time."

Critical reception
The Musical Hype wrote "'Cartoons'" opens mysteriously, with quirky, 'seedy-sounding' production that foreshadows the heat that's about to drop. Expectedly, cupcakKe enters turned up to the nth degree.  The rhymes are quick, hard AF, and not nearly as childish or playful as the title might suggest.  Even so, cupcakKe does deliver a cartoonish, catchy hook:
If I see carats-carrots like Bugs Bunny / I’m Batman, robbin’-Robin for the money / Strip her, bare feet like the Flintstones / Make a Tom and Jerry whole way home / I’m a snack so I attract Scooby Doo’s / Give ‘em Smurf dick, that’s balls blue / I don’t look for niggas so fuck Waldo / Bitch, I’m cocky like Johnny Bravo." Andrew Matson from Mass Appeal commented, "Lyrically, 'Cartoons' is a flex-a-thon, with a chorus name-checking all kinds of cartoon characters CupcakKe makes the formal concept sound easy [...] Rhymes seem to come naturally to her, whether freeform or based on a theme." "Her flow is incredible as she raps over a unique beat filled with all sorts of metallic percussion. Her lyrical capabilities are as great as ever as she combines her sex positivity with some braggadocios bars" wrote The Next Wave Chicago. XXL calls it "a more traditional, hammering drill track that finds her firing off a barrage of flamboyant, quick-witted flexes in an impressive display of breath control."

References

2017 singles
Cupcakke songs
2017 songs
Songs about television
Songs about fictional characters